Maitlhoko G. K. Mooka is a Botswanan politician who served as a member of the Pan-African Parliament for Botswana and the Parliament of Botswana for Moshupa/Manyana until 2009. He is a member of the Botswana Democratic Party.

References

Year of birth missing (living people)
Living people
Botswana politicians
Botswana Democratic Party politicians
Members of the Parliament of Botswana 
Members of the Pan-African Parliament from Botswana